Slackwater Cirque is the westernmost cirque on Eastwind Ridge which is connected to the "dead" western terminus of Towle Glacier, in the Convoy Range, Victoria Land. So little ice from Eastwind Ridge enters the cirque that it barely makes any contribution to the west end of the Towle Glacier and arcuate supraglacial moraines remain drifting within the cirque. So named by a 1989-90 New Zealand Antarctic Research Program (NZARP) field party to describe the sluggish ice flow of this cirque.

Cirques of Antarctica
Landforms of Victoria Land
Scott Coast